"Forever" is a song written by Buddy Killen, which was released by The Little Dippers and Billy Walker in January 1960.

Background and chart performance
Using the pseudonym "The Little Dippers", the Anita Kerr Singers recorded "Forever" in the fall of 1959. Their version of the song was released in January 1960, and spent 14 weeks on the Billboard Hot 100 chart, peaking at No. 9, while reaching No. 13 on Canada's CHUM Hit Parade.

Cover versions
Billy Walker also released a version of the song in January 1960, which spent 1 week on the Billboard Hot 100 chart, peaking at No. 83.
In 1964, Pete Drake released a cover of the song, which spent 11 weeks on the Billboard Hot 100 chart, peaking at No. 25, while reaching No. 5 on Billboards Pop-Standard Singles chart, and No. 17 on Canada's CHUM Hit Parade.
In 1969, Mercy released a cover of the song, which spent 5 weeks on the Billboard Hot 100 chart, peaking at No. 79, while reaching No. 24 on Billboards Easy Listening chart, No. 60 on Canada's RPM 100, and No. 24 on RPMs Adult Contemporary chart.

References

1960 songs
1960 singles
1964 singles
1969 singles
Songs written by Buddy Killen
Mercy (band) songs